5'-AMP-activated protein kinase catalytic subunit alpha-2 is an enzyme that in humans is encoded by the PRKAA2 gene.

Function 

The protein encoded by this gene is a catalytic subunit of the AMP-activated protein kinase (AMPK). AMPK is a heterotrimer consisting of an alpha catalytic subunit, and non-catalytic beta and gamma subunits. AMPK is an important energy-sensing enzyme that monitors cellular energy status. In response to cellular metabolic stresses, AMPK is activated, and thus phosphorylates and inactivates acetyl-CoA carboxylase (ACC) and beta-hydroxy beta-methylglutaryl-CoA reductase (HMGCR), key enzymes involved in regulating de novo biosynthesis of fatty acid and cholesterol. Studies of the mouse counterpart suggest that this catalytic subunit may control whole-body insulin sensitivity and is necessary for maintaining myocardial energy homeostasis during ischemia.

References

Further reading 

 
 
 
 
 
 
 
 
 
 
 
 
 
 
 
 
 

EC 2.7.11